"Beat the Clock" is a disco single by the American rock duo Sparks, which was released in 1979. It is named after the game show, Beat the Clock.

The song peaked at number 10 in August 1979 and spent six weeks in the UK Singles Chart. It was their third and final top ten single in the UK.

Background
The song was taken from the album No. 1 In Heaven and produced by Giorgio Moroder for Mellow B.V. During the late 1970s he was one of the premier producers, his working relationship grew from Sparks' appreciation of Donna Summer's dynamic "I Feel Love" which Moroder co-wrote and co-produced.

The 12" remix was the first of the group's extended remixes. The remix utilized the drum pattern from the songs midsection and added a new keyboard melody line during the chorus. The "long version" as it was dubbed was edited to three and a half minutes and released as the B-side to the 7" single. Long versions of "The Number One Song in Heaven" and "Tryouts for the Human Race" - both singles from the same album as "Beat the Clock" were merely the standard album versions.

An additional B-side on 12" versions was a commercial promoting the album No. 1 in Heaven, which featured clips of most of the tracks. The advert was narrated by Peter Cook. 12" versions came as colored picture discs, the inner 7" was a picture disc while the outer 5" came in a variety of differing colors such as blue, pink, green, and yellow.

The song was subsequently reworked for the album Plagiarism in 1997, and a live version was released as a B-side on the UK CD single "Now That I Own the BBC" in January 1996.

Track listing
Seven inch Virgin VS270
 "Beat the Clock" — 3:49
 "Beat the Clock" (Alternative Mix) — 3:32

12" Virgin VS27012
 "Beat the Clock" — 3:49
 "Untitled Commercial"
 "Beat the Clock" (Long Version) — 6:43

Chart positions

Personnel
 Ron Mael - keyboards, synthesiser, vocals
 Russell Mael - vocals
 Chris Bennett - backing vocals
 Keith Forsey - drums
 Jack Moran - backing vocals
 Giorgio Moroder - synthesiser
 Dan Wyman - synthesiser programming
 Dennis Young - backing vocals

References 

1979 singles
Disco songs
Songs written by Russell Mael
Songs written by Ron Mael
Sparks (band) songs
Song recordings produced by Giorgio Moroder